Aquareovirus is a genus of double-stranded RNA viruses in the family Reoviridae and subfamily Spinareovirinae. Fish, shellfish, and crustacean species serve as natural hosts. Aquareoviruses in general have low or no pathogenicity for fish. However, some cause hemorrhagic disease, hepatitis and pancreatitis. Grass carp hemorrhage virus (causes hemorrhagic disease of grass carp) is the most pathogenic aquareovirus. There are seven species in this genus.

Structure
Aquareoviruses are non-enveloped, with a double capsid structure that has icosahedral geometries, and T=13, T=2 symmetry. The diameter is around 75 nm.

Genome 

Aquareoviruses have double-stranded RNA genomes which are linear and segmented. The total genome length ranges from  18.2 to 30.5 kbp. The genome has eleven segments and codes for twelve proteins.

Life cycle
Viral replication is cytoplasmic. Entry into the host cell is achieved by attachment to host cell receptors, which mediates endocytosis. Replication follows the double-stranded RNA virus replication model. Double-stranded RNA virus transcription is the method of transcription. The virus exits the host cell by monopartite non-tubule guided viral movement. Fish, shellfish, and crustacean species serve as the natural host.

Taxonomy
The genus Aquareovirus has seven member species:

Aquareovirus A
Aquareovirus B
Aquareovirus C
Aquareovirus D
Aquareovirus E
Aquareovirus F
Aquareovirus G

References

External links
 Viralzone: Aquareovirus
 ICTV

Spinareovirinae
Virus genera